In marketing, the voice of the customer (VOC) summarizes customers' expectations, preferences and aversions.

A widely used form of VOC market research produces a detailed set of customer wants and needs, organized into a hierarchical structure, and then prioritized in terms of relative importance and satisfaction with current alternatives. VOC studies typically consist of both qualitative and quantitative research steps and are generally conducted at the start of any new product, process, or service design initiative in order to better understand the customer's wants and needs, and as the key input for new product definition, quality function deployment (QFD), and the setting of detailed design specifications.

Much has been written about this process, and there are many possible ways to gather the information – focus groups, individual interviews, contextual inquiry, ethnographic techniques, conjoint analysis, etc.  All involve a series of structured in-depth interviews, which focus on the customers' experiences with current products or alternatives within the category under consideration.  Needs statements are then extracted, organized into a more usable hierarchy, and then prioritized by the customers.

It is critical that the product development core team are involved in this process.  They must be the ones who take the lead in defining the topic, designing the sample (i.e. the types of customers to include), generating the questions for the discussion guide, either conducting or observing and analyzing the interviews, and extracting and processing the needs statements.

According to APICS the definition of VOC is: Actual customer descriptions in words for the functions and features customers desire for goods and services. In the strict definition, as relates to quality function deployment (QFD), the term customer indicates the external customer of the supplying entity.

See also 
User research
Voice of business
Sentiment analysis
ITIL
Conjoint analysis

References

Further reading
 Voice of the Customer: Capture and Analysis. McGraw Hill Professional.
 Acquiring, Processing, and Deploying: Voice of the Customer. CRC Press.
 Satisfaction: How Every Great Company Listens to the Voice of the Customer. Penguin.

Product management